Juan Carlos Romero Arribas (born October 12, 1963) is a Guatemalan sport shooter. Romero made his official debut for the 1996 Summer Olympics in Atlanta, where he placed twenty-sixth in men's skeet, with a score of 118 points, tying his position with five other shooters including British-born Cypriot Antonis Nikolaidis.

At the 2000 Summer Olympics in Sydney, Romero competed again for the second time in men's skeet, where he placed thirty-fifth overall, with a score of 117 points, tying his position with four other shooters including forty-two-year-old Michael Schmidt, Jr of the United States.

Romero made a comeback from his eight-year absence at the 2008 Summer Olympics in Beijing, where he competed for the third time in men's skeet shooting. He finished only in twenty-sixth place for the two-day qualifying rounds, with a total score of 111 points.

References

External links
NBC 2008 Olympics profile

Guatemalan male sport shooters
Living people
Olympic shooters of Guatemala
Shooters at the 1996 Summer Olympics
Shooters at the 2000 Summer Olympics
Shooters at the 2008 Summer Olympics
1963 births
Pan American Games medalists in shooting
Pan American Games bronze medalists for Guatemala
Shooters at the 1995 Pan American Games
20th-century Guatemalan people
21st-century Guatemalan people